Real Bad is the name of a fundraising party held annually in  San Francisco, California immediately following the Folsom Street Fair. The party, which occurs on the last Sunday in September, has been in existence since 1989. It is thrown by a non-profit organization called Grass Roots Gay Rights West (GRGR/West). Most of the money raised by the event comes from ticket sales, which are generated by a network of party hosts who sell tickets to friends. Proceeds from the party go to HIV/AIDS charities and LGBT health and community service organizations. In 2007, the party raised $150,000 for San Francisco Bay Area charities.

Because it serves as an unofficial closing event for Folsom Street Fair weekend, the party has a leather and BDSM bent.

See also
List of electronic music festivals

References

External links 
 Real Bad official site

Music festivals established in 1989
LGBT events in California
Culture of San Francisco
Circuit parties
Electronic music festivals in the United States
LGBT festivals in the United States